The Star Valley Wyoming Temple is a temple of the Church of Jesus Christ of Latter-day Saints in Star Valley, Wyoming. The temple was opened in 2016. The intent to build the temple was announced by church president Thomas S. Monson on October 1, 2011. The temple was announced concurrently with the Barranquilla Colombia, Durban South Africa, Kinshasa Democratic Republic of the Congo, and Provo City Center temples. When announced, the total number of temples worldwide increased to 166. When dedicated in 2016, it became the 154th temple of the church in operation. This is the first temple in Wyoming.

The temple is located east of U.S. highway 89 south of Afton, Wyoming. Craig C. Christensen presided at the temple's groundbreaking on April 25, 2015. A public open house was held from September 23 to October 8, 2016, excluding Sundays. The temple was dedicated by apostle David A. Bednar on October 30, 2016.

Star Valley is in Lincoln County, which has the highest percentage of Latter-day Saints in Wyoming.

In 2020, the Star Valley Wyoming Temple was closed temporarily that year in response to the coronavirus pandemic.

See also

 List of temples of The Church of Jesus Christ of Latter-day Saints
 List of temples of The Church of Jesus Christ of Latter-day Saints by geographic region
 Comparison of temples of The Church of Jesus Christ of Latter-day Saints
 Temple architecture (Latter-day Saints)
 The Church of Jesus Christ of Latter-day Saints in Wyoming

References

External links
Star Valley Wyoming Temple Official site
Star Valley Wyoming Temple at ChurchofJesusChristTemples.org

Latter Day Saint movement in Wyoming
Religious buildings and structures in Wyoming
21st-century Latter Day Saint temples
Buildings and structures in Lincoln County, Wyoming